Alonzo Martinez (born April 22, 1984) is an American professional mixed martial arts fighter.  Alonzo has fought twice for Bellator Fighting Championships as a lightweight and once with Strikeforce as a welterweight (though it was contested at a 160 lb catchweight). Martinez has been an MMA fighter for over eleven years, with notable fights against Toby Imada, and UFC vets Estevan Payan, Yves Edwards, and Yaotzin Meza. He is also known for his submission expertise, with 22 of his 36 career wins coming by submission.

Mixed martial arts career
Martinez made his professional mixed martial arts debut on March 15, 2003, when he faced Demi Deeds at Gladiators 20. He lost the fight via first-round TKO. Following the loss, Martinez would compile a record of 22–12–1, with wins over UFC veterans such as Luke Caudillo, Dustin Neace, and Waylon Lowe, before signing with Bellator in April 2009.

Bellator
Martinez made his Bellator debut on April 3, 2009, when he fought against Toby Imada at Bellator 1 in the quarterfinal of the first Bellator Fighting Championships Lightweight Tournament. He lost his debut via rear-naked choke.

He returned to Bellator on May 15, 2009, facing Victor Meza at Bellator 7 in a non-tournament bout. He won via rear-naked choke.

Strikeforce
Martinez had a one-fight stint for now-defunct promotion Strikeforce, facing Estevan Payan on January 7, 2012, at Strikeforce: Rockhold vs. Jardine. He lost the fight via unanimous decision.

Mixed martial arts record

|-
|Loss
|align=center|40–22–1
|Dan Moret
|Submission (rear-naked choke)
|VFC 59: Stots vs. Berdon
|
|align=center|1
|align=center|1:39
|Omaha, Nebraska, United States
|
|-
|Loss
|align=center|40–21–1
|Abdul-Rakhman Makhazhiev
|Submission (triangle choke)
|ACB 69: Young Eagles 22
|
|align=center|1
|align=center|3:27
|Almaty, Kazakhstan
|
|-
|Loss
|align=center|40–20–1
|Travis Perzynski
|TKO (punches)
|Fight Night at the Island: Saunders vs. Volkmann
|
|align=center|2
|align=center|2:21
|Welch, Minnesota, United States
|
|-
|Win
|align=center|40–19–1
|Kevin Tjaden
|KO (punch)
|KOTC: Summer Smash
|
|align=center|1
|align=center|0:32
|Sloan, Iowa, United States
|
|-
|Loss
|align=center|39–19–1
|Jarred Mercado
|Submission (rear-naked choke)
|Victory Fighting Championship 47
|
|align=center|2
|align=center|2:15
|Omaha, Nebraska, United States
|
|-
|Loss
|align=center|39–18–1
|Salman Zhamaldaev
|KO (punch)
|WFCA 9: Grozny Battle
|
|align=center|1
|align=center|0:48
|Grozny, Russia
|
|-
|Win
|align=center|39–17–1
|Cody Carrillo
|Decision (unanimous)
|VFC: Victory Fighting Championship 46
|
|align=center|3
|align=center|5:00
|Ralston, Nebraska, United States
|
|-
|Win
|align=center|38–17–1
|Josh Huber
|Decision (unanimous)
|VFC: Victory Fighting Championship 45
|
|align=center|3
|align=center|5:00
|Ralston, Nebraska, United States
|
|-
|Loss
|align=center|37–17–1
|Chad Curry
|TKO (punches)
|SEG: Caged Chaos at Canterbury Park 6
|
|align=center|2
|align=center|2:40
|Shakopee, Minnesota, United States
|
|-
|Win
|align=center|37–16–1
|Charlie DuBray
|TKO (punches)
|DCS 11: Seasons Beatings 2014
|
|align=center|1
|align=center|1:26
|Lincoln, Nebraska, United States
|
|-
|Win
|align=center|36–16–1
|Will Shutt
|Submission (guillotine choke)
|VFC 43: Neer vs. Coyle
|
|align=center| 2
|align=center| 1:45
|Ralston, Nebraska, United States
|
|-
|Loss
|align=center|35–16–1
|Estevan Payan
|Decision (unanimous)
|Strikeforce: Rockhold vs. Jardine
|
|align=center| 3
|align=center| 5:00
|Las Vegas, Nevada, United States
|
|-
|Win
|align=center|35–15–1
|Mario Ramos
|Submission (verbal)
|RFA 1: Elliot vs. Pulver
|
|align=center| 1
|align=center| 0:20
|Kearney, Nebraska, United States
|
|-
|Win
|align=center|34–15–1
|Charon Spain
|Decision (unanimous)
|EC: Extreme Challenge 200
|
|align=center| 3
|align=center| 5:00
|Council Bluffs, Iowa, United States
|
|-
|Loss
|align=center|33–15–1
|Porfirio Alves, Jr.
|Decision (unanimous)
|Superior Cage Combat 3
|
|align=center| 3
|align=center| 5:00
|Las Vegas, Nevada, United States
|
|-
|Win
|align=center|33–14–1
|Ryan Bixler
|Submission (rear-naked choke)
|CFC 7: Fright Night
|
|align=center| 1
|align=center| 2:26
|Lincoln, Nebraska, United States
|
|-
|Win
|align=center|32–14–1
|Ted Worthington
|Decision (unanimous)
|Disorderly Conduct 3
|
|align=center| 3
|align=center| 5:00
|Omaha, Nebraska, United States
|
|-
|Win
|align=center|31–14–1
|Abel Trujillo
|Technical Submission (guillotine choke)
|EC: Extreme Challenge 181
|
|align=center| 1
|align=center| 3:30
|Council Bluffs, Iowa, United States
|
|-
|Win
|align=center|30–14–1
|Aaron Derrow
|Decision (majority)
|Titan Fighting Championship 17
|
|align=center| 3
|align=center| 5:00
|Kansas City, Kansas, United States
|
|-
|Win
|align=center|29–14–1
|Deryck Ripley
|Submission (rear-naked choke)
|Titan Fighting Championship 16
|
|align=center| 2
|align=center| 2:19
|Kansas City, Kansas, United States
|
|-
|Win
|align=center|28–14–1
|Rod Montoya
|Submission (rear-naked choke)
|EC: Extreme Challenge 162
|
|align=center| 1
|align=center| 4:13
|Council Bluffs, Iowa, United States
|
|-
|Loss
|align=center|27–14–1
|Lloyd Woodard
|Submission (rear-naked choke)
|Extreme Challenge: High Stakes
|
|align=center| 1
|align=center| 4:15
|Council Bluffs, Iowa, United States
|
|-
|Win
|align=center|27–13–1
|Travis Perzynski
|Decision (unanimous)
|RG: Rochester Gladiators
|
|align=center| 3
|align=center| 5:00
|Rochester, Minnesota, United States
|
|-
|Win
|align=center|26–13–1
|Demi Deeds
|Submission (rear-naked choke)
|ROF 37: Warlords
|
|align=center| 1
|align=center| 4:54
|Omaha, Nebraska, United States
|
|-
|Win
|align=center|25–13–1
|Paul Bird
|Submission (rear-naked choke)
|MCC 24: Reloaded
|
|align=center| 1
|align=center| 3:44
|Des Moines, Iowa, United States
|
|-
|Win
|align=center|24–13–1
|Ryan Williams
|Decision (unanimous)
|AMMA 4: Adrenaline MMA 4
|
|align=center| 3
|align=center| 5:00
|Council Bluffs, Iowa, United States
|
|-
|Win
|align=center|23–13–1
|Victor Meza
|Submission (rear-naked choke)
|Bellator 7
|
|align=center| 2
|align=center| 2:43
|Chicago, Illinois, United States
|
|-
|Loss
|align=center|22–13–1
|Toby Imada
|Submission (rear-naked choke)
|Bellator 1
|
|align=center| 1
|align=center| 3:26
|Hollywood, Florida, United States
|
|-
|Draw
|align=center|22–12–1
|Joe Brammer
|Draw
|Glory Fighting Championships 5
|
|align=center| 3
|align=center| 5:00
|Alabama, United States
|
|-
|Loss
|align=center|22–12
|Yaotzin Meza
|Submission (guillotine choke)
|Evolution MMA
|
|align=center| 2
|align=center| 2:08
|Phoenix, Arizona, United States
|
|-
|Win
|align=center|22–11
|Brandon Melendez
|Submission (guillotine choke)
|VFC 24: Revolution
|
|align=center| 2
|align=center| N/A
|Council Bluffs, Iowa, United States
|
|-
|Win
|align=center|21–11
|Ted Worthington
|Decision (unanimous)
|VFC 22: Ascension
|
|align=center| 3
|align=center| 5:00
|Iowa, United States
|
|-
|Loss
|align=center|20–11
|Yves Edwards
|Submission (rear-naked choke)
|HDNet Fights: Reckless Abandon
|
|align=center| 2
|align=center| 3:04
|Dallas, Texas, United States
|
|-
|Win
|align=center|20–10
|Ryan Roberts
|Submission
|VFC 20: Aces
|
|align=center| 1
|align=center| N/A
|Council Bluffs, Iowa, United States
|
|-
|Win
|align=center|19–10
|Waylon Lowe
|Submission (punches)
|FF 12: Fightfest 12
|
|align=center| 1
|align=center| 3:07
|Canton, Ohio, United States
|
|-
|Win
|align=center|18–10
|Dustin Neace
|Submission (punches)
|GFC 1: Genesis
|
|align=center| 1
|align=center| 1:10
|Des Moines, Iowa, United States
|
|-
|Win
|align=center|17–10
|John Owens
|Submission (rear-naked choke)
|VFC 18: Hitmen
|
|align=center| 1
|align=center| 2:18
|Council Bluffs, Iowa, United States
|
|-
|Win
|align=center|16–10
|Vadim Ivanov
|TKO (punches)
|FF 10: Fightfest 10
|
|align=center| 2
|align=center| 1:12
|Cleveland, Ohio, United States
|
|-
|Win
|align=center|15–10
|Mike Bogner
|Submission (triangle choke)
|FF 8: Fightfest 8
|
|align=center| 1
|align=center| 4:20
|Cleveland, Ohio, United States
|
|-
|Win
|align=center|14–10
|Luke Caudillo
|Submission (guillotine choke)
|VFC 16: Kings
|
|align=center| 2
|align=center| N/A
|Council Bluffs, Iowa, United States
|
|-
|Loss
|align=center|13–10
|Clay French
|Submission (rear-naked choke)
|EC 70: Extreme Challenge 70
|
|align=center| 1
|align=center| 3:34
|Hayward, Wisconsin, United States
|
|-
|Win
|align=center|13–9
|Alex Carter
|Submission (neck crank)
|MCC 4: The Rematch
|
|align=center| 2
|align=center| 0:22
|Des Moines, Iowa, United States
|
|-
|Win
|align=center|12–9
|Rocky Long
|Decision (unanimous)
|Diesel Fighting Championship 1
|
|align=center| 3
|align=center| 5:00
|Dallas, Texas, United States
|
|-
|Loss
|align=center|11–9
|Luke Caudillo
|TKO (punches)
|VFC 13: Redemption
|
|align=center| 2
|align=center| 4:59
|North Platte, Nebraska, United States
|
|-
|Win
|align=center|11–8
|Mike Schoech
|KO (knee)
|AFC 6: Full Force
|
|align=center| N/A
|align=center| N/A
|Omaha, Nebraska, United States
|
|-
|Win
|align=center|10–8
|Kendrick Johnson
|Submission (punches)
|VFC 12: Warpath
|
|align=center| 1
|align=center| N/A
|Council Bluffs, Iowa, United States
|
|-
|Win
|align=center|9–8
|Rob Marcks
|TKO (punches)
|AFC 5: Lights Out
|
|align=center| 2
|align=center| N/A
|Omaha, Nebraska, United States
|
|-
|Win
|align=center|8–8
|Nathan Hardin
|KO (punch)
|AFC 4: New Hitter
|
|align=center| 1
|align=center| 1:11
|Omaha, Nebraska, United States
|
|-
|Win
|align=center|7–8
|Brian Dunn
|Submission (rear-naked choke)
|AFC 3: Impact
|
|align=center| 1
|align=center| 2:45
|Omaha, Nebraska, United States
|
|-
|Loss
|align=center|6–8
|Alvin Robinson
|Submission (rear-naked choke)
|ROF 19: Showdown
|
|align=center| 2
|align=center| 1:14
|Castle Rock, Colorado, United States
|
|-
|Win
|align=center|6–7
|Sean Huffman
|Submission (rear-naked choke)
|VFC 10: Championship X
|
|align=center| 1
|align=center| 4:48
|Council Bluffs, Iowa, United States
|
|-
|Loss
|align=center|5–7
|Hector Munoz
|Submission (armbar)
|Inferno Promotions: Meltdown
|
|align=center| 1
|align=center| 0:43
|Texas, United States
|
|-
|Loss
|align=center|5–6
|Donnie Liles
|Submission (rear-naked choke)
|ROF 17: Unstoppable
|
|align=center| 1
|align=center| 4:17
|Castle Rock, Colorado, United States
|
|-
|Win
|align=center|5–5
|Nick Dolucre
|TKO (punches)
|AFC 2: Bring it On
|
|align=center| 1
|align=center| 4:40
|Omaha, Nebraska, United States
|
|-
|Loss
|align=center|4–5
|Clay Guida
|Submission (arm-triangle choke)
|XKK: Des Moines
|
|align=center| 3
|align=center| 3:22
|Des Moines, Iowa, United States
|
|-
|Win
|align=center|4–4
|Joe Mabin
|Submission (punches)
|XKK: Des Moines
|
|align=center| 1
|align=center| N/A
|Des Moines, Iowa, United States
|
|-
|Win
|align=center|3–4
|Rob Marcks
|Submission (punches)
|AFC 1: Takedown
|
|align=center| N/A
|align=center| N/A
|Omaha, Nebraska, United States
|
|-
|Win
|align=center|2–4
|Jake Hudson
|KO (punch)
|VFC 9: Madness
|
|align=center| 1
|align=center| N/A
|Council Bluffs, Iowa, United States
|
|-
|Loss
|align=center|1–4
|Victor Moreno
|TKO (punches)
|EC 57: Extreme Challenge 57
|
|align=center| 1
|align=center| 4:49
|Council Bluffs, Iowa, United States
|
|-
|Loss
|align=center|1–3
|Victor Moreno
|N/A
|POI: Point of Impact
|
|align=center| 1
|align=center| N/A
|Des Moines, Iowa, United States
|
|-
|Loss
|align=center|1–2
|Jason Ireland
|Submission (rear-naked choke)
|VFC 6: Overload
|
|align=center| 2
|align=center| 2:41
|Council Bluffs, Iowa, United States
|
|-
|Win
|align=center|1–1
|Luke Caudillo
|TKO (corner stoppage)
|VFC 6: Overload
|
|align=center| 3
|align=center| 2:32
|Council Bluffs, Iowa, United States
|
|-
|Loss
|align=center|0–1
|Demi Deeds
|TKO (punches)
|Gladiators 20
|
|align=center| 1
|align=center| 4:02
|Des Moines, Iowa, United States
|
|-

Amateur mixed martial arts record

|Win
|align=center| 2–0 (1)
|Ali ILeiwi
|TKO (punches)
|Xtreme Fight Championship 1
|
|align=center| 1
|align=center| N/A
|Tyler, Texas, United States
|
|-
|NC
|align=center| 1–0 (1)
|Demi Deeds
|No Contest
|THFC - Ground Zero 3
|
|align=center| 3
|align=center| N/A
|Des Moines, Iowa, United States
|
|-
|Win
|align=center| 1–0
|Enoch Wilson
|Submission (punches)
|THFC - Ground Zero 2
|
|align=center| 1
|align=center| N/A
|Des Moines, Iowa, United States
|

See also
 List of male mixed martial artists

References

External links

American male mixed martial artists
Lightweight mixed martial artists
1984 births
Living people
People from Papillion, Nebraska
Sportspeople from Nebraska